A fish trap is a trap used for fishing. Fish traps include fishing weirs, lobster traps, and some fishing nets such as fyke nets.

Traps are culturally almost universal and seem to have been independently invented many times. There are two main types of trap, a permanent or semi-permanent structure placed in a river or tidal area and bottle or pot trap that are usually, but not always baited to attract prey, and are periodically lifted out of the water.

A typical contemporary trap consists of a frame of thick steel wire in the shape of a heart, with chicken wire stretched around it. The mesh wraps around the frame and then tapers into the inside of the trap. Fishes that swim inside through this opening cannot get out, as the chicken wire opening bends back into its original narrowness. In earlier times, traps were constructed of wood and fibre. Fish traps contribute to the problems of marine debris and bycatch. 


History

Traps are culturally almost universal and seem to have been independently invented many times. There are essentially two types of trap, a permanent or semi-permanent structure placed in a river or tidal area and bottle or pot trap that are usually, but not always baited to attract prey, and are periodically lifted out of the water.

The Mediterranean Sea, with an area of about of 2.5 million km2 (970,000 sq mi), is shaped according to the principle of a bottle trap. It is easy for fish from the Atlantic Ocean to swim into the Mediterranean through the narrow neck at Gibraltar, and difficult for them to find their way out. It has been described as "the largest fish trap in the world".

The prehistoric Yaghan people who inhabited the Tierra Del Fuego area constructed stonework in shallow inlets that would effectively confine fish at low tide levels. Some of this extant stonework survives at Bahia Wulaia at the Bahia Wulaia Dome Middens archaeological site.

In southern Italy, during the 17th century, a new fishing technique began to be used. The trabucco is an old fishing machine typical of the coast of Gargano protected as historical monuments by the homonym National Park. This giant trap, built in structural wood, is spread along the coast of southern Adriatic especially in the province of Foggia, in some areas of the Abruzzese coastlines and also in some parts of the coast of southern Tyrrhenian Sea.

The Stilbaai Tidal Fish Traps are ancient intertidal stonewall fish traps that occur in various spots on the Western Cape coast of South Africa from Gansbaai to Mosselbaai. The existing fish traps that can still be seen have been built during the past 300 years, some as recently as the latter part of the 20th century, whilst others could date as far back as 3,000 years.

Indigenous Australians were, prior to European colonization, most populous in Australia's better-watered areas such as the Murray-Darling river system of the south-east. Here, where water levels fluctuate seasonally, they constructed ingenious stone fish traps. Most have been completely or partially destroyed. The largest and best-known are those on the Barwon River at Brewarrina, New South Wales, which are at least partly preserved. The Brewarrina fish traps caught huge numbers of migratory native fish as the Barwon River rose in flood and then fell. In southern Victoria, indigenous people created an elaborate system of canals, some more than 2 km long. The purpose of these canals was to attract and catch eels, a fish of short coastal rivers (as opposed to rivers of the Murray-Darling system). The eels were caught by a variety of traps including stone walls constructed across canals with a net placed across an opening in the wall. Traps at different levels in the marsh came into operation as the water level rose and fell. Somewhat similar stone-wall traps were constructed by Native American Pit River people in north-eastern California. In South Australia, the Barngarla people of Eyre Peninsula combined the use of fish traps with singing "to call sharks and dolphins to chase the fish into the fish traps, where the Barngarla people would appear to spear and stone the fish."

A technique called dam fishing is used by the Baka pygmies. This involves the construction of a temporary dam resulting in a drop in the water levels downstream— allowing fish to be easily collected.

Also used in Chile, mainly in Chiloé, which were unusually abundant (fish weir and basket fish trap).

Types and methods
The manner in which fish traps are used depends on local conditions and the behaviour of the local fish. For example, a fish trap might be placed in shallow water near rocks where pikes like to lie. If placed correctly, traps can be very effective. It is usually not necessary to check the trap daily, since the fish remain alive inside the trap, relatively unhurt. Because of this, the trap also allows for the release of undersized fish as per fishing regulations.

Fish traps contribute to the problem of marine debris, unless they are made of biodegradable material, says a United Nations report. For example, fishers lost 31,600 crab traps in the Bristol Bay (Alaska) in a period of two years. Each year, fisheries in Chesapeake Bay (Northeastern United States) lose or abandon 12 to 20 percent of their crab traps, according to a government report. These traps continue to trap animals. Fish traps can also trap protected species such as platypus in Australia.

See also
 Animal trapping
 Fishing net
 Eel buck

Notes

References
 Slack-Smith RJ (2001) Fishing with Traps and Pots Volume 26 of FAO training series, FAO, Rome. .
 Alvarez, R., Munita, M., Fredes, J. y Mera, R. Corrales de pesca en Chiloé. Imprenta América.

External links
 
 Corral de pesca
 Fish traps

Fishing equipment
Fishing techniques and methods